"Hoppípolla" is a song by Icelandic post-rock band Sigur Rós from their 2005 album Takk.... It was released as the album's second single on 28 November 2005. As with many of the band's songs, it was given a nickname in the early stages of writing. "Hoppípolla" was "The Money Song", as the band was certain they had written a song which would have commercial success.

"Hoppípolla" is the band's most successful single, charting at number 24 on the UK Singles Chart in May 2006. It is considered the best-known song within its genre. The single also features "Með blóðnasir", an instrumental coda to "Hoppípolla", which is also featured on Takk...; and a studio remake of "Hafssól", a song previously released on the band's 1997 debut album, Von. The title appears as "Hafsól" on the single.

Track listings
CD (CDEM 673) / 12-inch (12EM 673)
"Hoppípolla" – 4:36
"Með blóðnasir" – 2:24
"Hafsól" (2005 version) – 9:47

7-inch (EM 673)
"Hoppípolla" – 4:36
"Heysátan" – 4:09

Music video
A promotional music video for "Hoppípolla," directed by Arni & Kinski, was filmed in November 2005. It depicts two groups of elderly friends strolling around the suburbs of Reykjavík and acting like children; pulling pranks on people and battling with water balloons and wooden swords near a cemetery. When one old man is injured and suffers a nosebleed (as referenced in the lyrics), the opponents run away in fear, while the others celebrate their victory. The video shows several shots of the friends "hopping in puddles" of water along a path.

The band members are featured in the video: keyboardist Kjartan Sveinsson plays the victim of a Knock, Knock, Ginger trick, guitarist and vocalist Jón Þór Birgisson plays the cashier at a shop where an old man steals and eats some pears, drummer Orri Páll Dýrason can be seen repairing his bicycle, and bassist Georg Hólm can be seen cleaning.

Charts

Certifications

Chicane cover version – "Poppiholla"

In July 2009, Chicane released an instrumental re-work of the song, titled "Poppiholla" and released it as a five track single EP on 13 July 2009. "Poppiholla" entered the UK Singles Chart at number seven on 19 July 2009, spending three weeks in the top ten as of 2 August 2009. A video to promote the song was made, and Chicane's The Best of Chicane collection was re-released to include the song. The re-released album reached number 11 on the UK Albums Chart, beating the compilation's previous peak of number 16 (without "Poppiholla" on it). The song was used in the UK by Sky Sports for their coverage of the Guinness Premiership in 2009–10.

Release history

Charts

Year-end charts

Use in film and television
"Hoppípolla" was used in 2006 advertisements for the BBC's Planet Earth television series, giving the band exposure to a mainstream audience. A high demand for the single led to it being republished in May 2006, distributed by EMI. This re-release of the single brought critical acclaim for the band in the mainstream music media. It was used again in 2016 for Planet Earth II, as well as Blue Planet II the following year.

The song has been used as background music in BBC shows, including dramas, documentaries and its 2006 football coverage. It appeared in the trailers for the films Children of Men and Slumdog Millionaire, the soundtrack of the 2006 film Penelope, the 2011 film We Bought a Zoo, and the 2021 film The Mitchells vs. the Machines, the latter of which was composed by Jónsi and has been used in advertisements for Thomson Reuters, Oxfam and Viasat. The song has also been used in the film of Italian capital Rome's bid for the 2024 Summer Olympics. While it does not appear on the film's soundtrack album, it is also featured in Eurovision Song Contest: The Story of Fire Saga.

References

External links
 Sigur Rós's official page on the Hoppípolla single
 Always on the Run - Sigur Rós Lyrics Translations
 

Sigur Rós songs
2005 singles
Chicane (musician) songs
Icelandic-language songs
Songs written by Jónsi
Songs written by Orri Páll Dýrason
Songs written by Georg Hólm
Songs written by Kjartan Sveinsson
2005 songs
EMI Records singles
Armada Music singles